Yangon City Development Committee (abbreviated YCDC) is the administrative body of Yangon, the largest city and former capital of Myanmar (Burma). It consists of 20 departments, with headquarters in the Yangon City Hall. The committee's chairman also acts as the city's mayor.

The YCDC is technically independent of the government, and raises its own revenues through tax collection, fees, licenses and property development. In the 2011-2012 budget year, YCDC had an estimated deficit of Ks.5 billion, because of high spending on road construction and purchase of waste collection vehicles.

List of mayors of Yangon

History

On 14 May 1990, the Yangon City Development Law formally established the present incarnation of YCDC, delegating wide responsibilities to this body, including city planning, land administration, tax collection, and development. However, the YCDC is also responsible for duties stipulated in the 1922 Rangoon Municipal Act.

e-Government initiative
In 2003, YCDC was organized to provide e-Government for Yangon City. The main purposes of the city's e-Government program are to provide easy access between the government and the city's citizens via the Internet, to reduce paper usage, to reduce the city budget, to build the city's fiber ring, to provide timely public information, to store public data and to develop and expand G2G, G2C, G2B, and G2E programs.

In January 2013 responsibility for e-Government was divided between the e-Government Administration Committee and the e-Government Processing Committee. The e-Government Administration Committee includes the mayor of Yangon City as patron, the secretary of YCDC as chairman, and the other 20 head of departments member. The e-Government Working Committee includes the head of public relations and information department as chairman.

Responsibilities

The YCDC is responsible for the city's:
 waste management (including collection and treatment)
 business licenses and registries
 water supply
 roads and bridges
 environmental regulations
 maintenance of public property (including parks, heritage sites)
 street lighting
 firefighting

Cemetery maintenance
YCDC's environmental maintenance department maintains 8 cemeteries in Yangon:
Yayway Cemetery, North Okkalapa Township
Hteinbin Cemetery, Hlaingthaya Township
Kyizu Cemetery, Dagon Seikkan Township
Daweigyaung Cemetery, North Dagon Township
Kyugyaung Cemetery, Shwepyitha Township
Dala Cemetery, Dala Township
Seikkan Khanaungto Cemetery, Seikkyi Kanaungto Township
Seikgyi Cemetery, Kyimyindaing Township.

Organization
The YCDC is organized as follows:
Cabinet
 Mayor
 Secretary
 Joint-Secretary
 Committee Members No.(4) to No.(9)

YCDC organization chart

 Committee Office
 Administration Department
 Budget and Accounts Department
 Inspection Department
 Co-ordination Department
 Assessor Department
 Revenue Department
 Markets Department
 Veterinary and Slaughter House Department
 Pollution Control and Cleansing Department
 Engineering Department (Roads & Bridges)
 Engineering Department(Buildings)
 Engineering Department (Water & Sanitation)
 Motor Transport & Workshop Department
 Central Stores Department
 Playgrounds, Parks & Gardens Department
 Security and Disciplinary Department
 City Planning & Land Administration Department
 Health Department
 Public Relations and Informations Department
 Production Department
 Yangon City Golf Club
 Yangon City Bank

Controversy

YCDC's construction permit system has been criticized for its inefficiency; the average construction time is 2–3 years, because permissions are required from at least 6 YCDC bodies.

In 2015, the YCDC suspended a massive development project called Dagon City, to be built near Shwedagon Pagoda, for failing to adhere to regulations stipulating the building height limits in the vicinity of the pagoda, which is a heritage site. In 2015, YCDC's tender selection process for the construction of the Mindhamma Secondary Central Business District in Mayangon Township was called into question by non-selected bidders.

In April 2018, Zaykabar Company demolished a Yangon heritage site, the Mayor's Residence, which is listed on the YCDC's Yangon City Heritage List. The demolition sparked controversy over YCDC's oversight from watchdog groups like the Yangon Heritage Trust. YCDC subsequently granted approval for Zaykabar to construct a $500 million development project, the Myayeiknyo Royal Project, on the site of the former heritage building. The project has also been opposed by locals for its proximity to other heritage sites like Shwedagon Pagoda, and for concerns that the development may impact the adjacent Kokkine reservoir, which distributes water to eight townships. In June 2018, due to ongoing controversy, the Burmese military ordered Zaykabar to reconstruct the Mayor's Residence "in the original style." Later that year, in October 2018, the military terminated its lease contract with Zaykabar, over contractual breaches, as Zaykabar had signed a joint venture agreement with a Chinese company.

In 2018, Yangon Region Hluttaw lawmakers criticized YCDC's US$80 million loan from the French Development Agency to dredge Pazundaung Creek to develop a waterfront corridor. In October 2019, YCDC courted controversy from the Yangon Region Hluttaw over the purchase of 80 vehicles at a cost of US$1.37 million for city officials.

YCDC sits on the board of directors of the New Yangon City Development Company, which is the developer of a controversial development project, the Yangon New City Project. YCDC has overseen infrastructure tenders for the project.

References

External links
Yangon City official web portal

Yangon
Government agencies of Myanmar